Vehicle registration plates of Washington may refer to:

 Vehicle registration plates of Washington (state)
 Vehicle registration plates of Washington, D.C.